Sridhara Kandali was medieval vaishnavite poet from Kamrup region of Assam.
He was known for his poetry work named "Kumara Harana".

See also
 Vishnu Bharati
 Sarvabhauma Bhattacharya

References

Year of birth missing
Year of death missing
Kamrupi literary figures